Olesya I. Zhupanska is a Ukrainian and American mechanical engineer and materials scientist whose research concerns composite materials and their application in extreme environments, such as in wind turbine blades subject to lightning strikes. She is a professor in the Department of Aerospace & Mechanical Engineering at the University of Arizona.

Education and career
Zhupanska graduated from the Taras Shevchenko National University of Kyiv in 1996 with a bachelor's and master's degree in mechanics and applied mathematics. She continued in the same program for a Ph.D. in 2000.

After holding postdoctoral and visiting positions at the University of Florida from 2002 to 2007, in 2007 she became an assistant professor in the Department of Mechanical and Industrial Engineering at the University of Iowa, where she was promoted to associate professor in 2013. In 2016, she moved to her present position as a full professor at the University of Arizona.

Recognition

Zhupanska's research with Air Force Research Laboratory scientist Bob Sierakowski won the 2007 American Society of Mechanical Engineers Boeing Best Paper Award. She was named an ASME Fellow in 2017. The University of Arizona listed her as one of the 2022 winners of their Women of Impact in Research & Innovation Award.

References

Year of birth missing (living people)
Living people
American aerospace engineers
American mechanical engineers
American materials scientists
American women engineers
Ukrainian aerospace engineers
Ukrainian mechanical engineers
Ukrainian women engineers
Women materials scientists and engineers
Taras Shevchenko National University of Kyiv alumni
University of Iowa faculty
University of Arizona faculty
Fellows of the American Society of Mechanical Engineers